Women In Tech: Take Your Career to the Next Level with Practical Advice and Inspiring Stories is a 2016 professional career guide written by Tarah Wheeler and published by Sasquatch Books. The book began as a Kickstarter project, with 772 backers and $32,226 in funding.

The book includes advice for women in developing career skills such as salary negotiation, networking, and finding work–life balance, as well as personal stories from female tech professionals.

Reception and Impact
Library Journal called Women in Tech "The essential handbook for women in technology -- engaging, practical, and inspirational."

In the fall of 2016 the University of California, Berkeley taught a class on Wheeler's book and the necessities for overcoming barriers to entry in the technology industry and the requirements for success as a woman trying to enter the field.

Women in Tech has been translated into Korean.

References

2016 non-fiction books
Books about women
Women in  technology
Sasquatch Books books
Women and employment